Weza is a settlement in Ugu District Municipality in the KwaZulu-Natal province of South Africa.

Village some 20 km west of Harding and 50 km east of Kokstad. It takes its name from the Weza River, a northern tributary of the Mtamvuna River. Of Zulu origin, the name is said to mean ‘to cause to cross over’.

The main business activity in Weza is the Hans Marensky saw mill that has been operational for more than 30years in the area. The Weza State forest close to town offers visitors a relaxing breakaway with lovely hiking trails and mountain biking trails. The forest is also home to the endangered Cape Parrot and other bird life making it a wonderful place for bird watching.

References

Populated places in the uMuziwabantu Local Municipality
KwaZulu-Natal South Coast